John Bamlet Smallman was an Irish-Canadian businessman (9 March 1849 – 14 February 1916).

A son of James Knight Smallman and Eliza Switzer, John was born in Clifden, County Galway, Ireland. The family emigrated in 1859 to London, Ontario, Canada West where his father became active as a commission merchant.

From age 14 to 21, Smallman worked as a clerk, saving enough money to form a partnership with his fellow Methodist, Lemuel Hill Ingram, a clerk in a local wholesale establishment. They ran a successful business, and in 1882 they were purchasing direct from British suppliers on cash terms. Within ten years trade had increased to $110,000, staff productivity had more than doubled (to $9,200 per clerk), expenses had fallen from 16 to 11 percent of turnover and profits were averaging 10 percent. Smallman and Ingram expanded their business by acquiring new premises in 1892. They purchased adjacent properties and added shoe and toy departments (only to be discarded as insufficiently profitable). Soon an even larger location was secured. By the turn of the century the store employed more than 100 clerks.

Smallman bought Ingram's interest at the latter's death in January 1901, bringing his own nephew and two of Ingram's children into the business. It was incorporated in 1908.

Smallman suffered a nervous breakdown and two strokes. He died on 14 February 1916. His obituary stated that he never mixed in politics, was a member of First Methodist Church and supported the Children’s Aid Society and the Irish Benevolent Society. The bulk of his shares in his business were bequeathed to the Western University of London, Ontario.

References 

 

1849 births
1916 deaths
19th-century Canadian businesspeople
People from County Galway
Businesspeople from London, Ontario
Irish expatriates in Canada
19th-century Irish businesspeople